"In Your Words" is a song by American singer Rebecca Black. The single was released on November 23, 2012, and the music video was released the same day.

Composition
"In Your Words" is an emotional midtempo acoustic guitar-driven country pop song, where Rebecca Black sings that she is "moving on/Cause you set me free/And I'm trying to be as much of myself as if you were here with me...", after breaking up with somebody. Black explained the song in a 2012 interview:  Black has also said that her manager "likes to use a term, which is a pretty good analogy, that it's Taylor Swift without the twang."

Critical response
Joann Pan from Mashable praised Rebecca Black's improved vocals and maturity from her previous releases. She wrote about the single: "The catchy song, set to a more leisurely tempo than her previous releases, may be one for the haters who have criticized her looks, singing and lyrics."

Music video
 
Filming for the video was finished in October 2012, and behind-the-scenes photos for the video were released less than a week after the video was done shooting. A teaser of the video was uploaded on November 9, 2012, and the video was officially released the same day as the single. Black said about the video:

Live performances
The song was performed live by Rebecca Black for her debut concert at the House of Blues on December 24, 2012.

References

2012 singles
Country pop songs
Rebecca Black songs
2012 songs